Jędrzychów  is a village (former town) in the administrative district of Gmina Polkowice, within Polkowice County, Lower Silesian Voivodeship, in south-western Poland.

References

Villages in Polkowice County
Former populated places in Lower Silesian Voivodeship